Pregnanediol may refer to:

 Allopregnanediols:
 5α-Pregnane-3β,20α-diol
 5α-Pregnane-3α,20β-diol
 5α-Pregnane-3β,20β-diol
 Allopregnanediol (5α-pregnane-3α,20α-diol)

 Pregnanediols:
 5β-Pregnane-3β,20α-diol
 5β-Pregnane-3α,20β-diol
 5β-Pregnane-3β,20β-diol
 Pregnanediol (5β-pregnane-3α,20α-diol)

See also
 Progesterone
 Pregnanedione
 Pregnanolone
 Pregnanetriol
 Dihydroprogesterone
 Hydroxyprogesterone

References

Diols
Pregnanes